Wesley Heights is a streetcar station in Charlotte, North Carolina. The at-grade island platform on West Trade Street is a stop along the CityLynx Gold Line, serving the Wesley Heights Historic District.

Location 
Wesley Heights station is located at the intersection of Frazier Avenue, Wesley Heights Way, and West Trade Street, just west of Bill Lee Freeway (I-77/US 21). The Wesley Heights neighborhood, part of West End, was developed in 1911 as a streetcar suburb and features notable examples of Bungalow / American Craftsman, Colonial Revival, and Tudor Revival style architecture.

History 
Wesley Heights station was approved as a Gold Line Phase 2 stop in 2013. In tandem with the project, nearby Frazier Avenue was realigned to make an intersection with Wesley Heights Way, at a cost of $1.62 million (2021 US dollars). Construction began in Fall 2016 and was slated to open in early-2020, but various delays pushed out the opening till mid-2021. The station opened to the public on August 30, 2021.

Station layout 
The station consists of an island platform with two passenger shelters; a crosswalk and ramp provide platform access from West Trade Street. The station's passenger shelters house two art installations by George Bates. The windscreens are titled: The Worth of That, is That Which It Contains and That is This, and This With Thee Remains. The title comes from a 1954 JCSU yearbook excerpt referencing Shakespeare's sonnet 74. The micro and macro figures and images share the specific and general history of the area.

References

External links
 
 Historic West End

Lynx Gold Line stations
Railway stations in the United States opened in 2021
2021 establishments in North Carolina